The 1946 VFL season was the 50th season of the Victorian Football League (VFL), the highest level senior Australian rules football competition in Victoria.

The season featured twelve clubs, ran from 20 April until 5 October, and comprised a 19-game home-and-away season followed by a finals series featuring the top four clubs. The league's thirds/under-19s competition played its inaugural season.

The premiership was won by the Essendon Football Club for the eighth time, after it defeated  by 63 points in the 1946 VFL Grand Final.

Premiership season
In 1946, the VFL competition consisted of twelve teams of 18 on-the-field players each, plus two substitute players, known as the 19th man and the 20th man. A player could be substituted for any reason; however, once substituted, a player could not return to the field of play under any circumstances.

Teams played each other in a home-and-away season of 19 rounds; matches 12 to 19 were the "home-and-away reverse" of matches 1 to 8.

The determination of the 1946 season's fixtures were complicated by the fact that both the Melbourne Cricket Ground and the Lake Oval were still unavailable and, because of this, Melbourne shared the Punt Road Oval with Richmond as their home ground, and South Melbourne shared the Junction Oval with St Kilda as their home ground. Melbourne resumed using the Melbourne Cricket Ground as its home ground in round 17.

Once the 19 round home-and-away season had finished, the 1946 VFL Premiers were determined by the specific format and conventions of the Page–McIntyre system.

Round 1

|- bgcolor="#CCCCFF"
| Home team
| Home team score
| Away team
| Away team score
| Venue
| Crowd
| Date
|- bgcolor="#FFFFFF"
| 
| 12.11 (83)
| 
| 12.15 (87)
| Brunswick Street Oval
| 32,000
| 20 April 1946
|- bgcolor="#FFFFFF"
| 
| 20.17 (137)
| 
| 12.19 (91)
| Punt Road Oval
| 18,000
| 20 April 1946
|- bgcolor="#FFFFFF"
| 
| 15.10 (100)
| 
| 14.14 (98)
| Western Oval
| 26,000
| 20 April 1946
|- bgcolor="#FFFFFF"
| 
| 19.23 (137)
| 
| 12.6 (78)
| Arden Street Oval
| 11,000
| 22 April 1946
|- bgcolor="#FFFFFF"
| 
| 7.19 (61)
| 
| 18.16 (124)
| Glenferrie Oval
| 19,000
| 22 April 1946
|- bgcolor="#FFFFFF"
| 
| 16.13 (109)
| 
| 18.9 (117)
| Junction Oval
| 38,000
| 22 April 1946

Round 2

|- bgcolor="#CCCCFF"
| Home team
| Home team score
| Away team
| Away team score
| Venue
| Crowd
| Date
|- bgcolor="#FFFFFF"
| 
| 15.14 (104)
| 
| 9.19 (73)
| Kardinia Park
| 7,500
| 27 April 1946
|- bgcolor="#FFFFFF"
| 
| 10.11 (71)
| 
| 8.5 (53)
| Windy Hill
| 16,000
| 27 April 1946
|- bgcolor="#FFFFFF"
| 
| 10.14 (74)
| 
| 8.10 (58)
| Victoria Park
| 22,000
| 27 April 1946
|- bgcolor="#FFFFFF"
| 
| 9.12 (66)
| 
| 10.12 (72)
| Princes Park
| 21,000
| 27 April 1946
|- bgcolor="#FFFFFF"
| 
| 15.15 (105)
| 
| 19.19 (133)
| Punt Road Oval
| 23,000
| 27 April 1946
|- bgcolor="#FFFFFF"
| 
| 11.3 (69)
| 
| 16.21 (117)
| Junction Oval
| 14,000
| 27 April 1946

Round 3

|- bgcolor="#CCCCFF"
| Home team
| Home team score
| Away team
| Away team score
| Venue
| Crowd
| Date
|- bgcolor="#FFFFFF"
| 
| 16.14 (110)
| 
| 6.15 (51)
| Punt Road Oval
| 17,000
| 4 May 1946
|- bgcolor="#FFFFFF"
| 
| 20.19 (139)
| 
| 9.9 (63)
| Brunswick Street Oval
| 12,000
| 4 May 1946
|- bgcolor="#FFFFFF"
| 
| 21.15 (141)
| 
| 12.13 (85)
| Windy Hill
| 17,000
| 4 May 1946
|- bgcolor="#FFFFFF"
| 
| 12.14 (86)
| 
| 14.18 (102)
| Junction Oval
| 25,000
| 4 May 1946
|- bgcolor="#FFFFFF"
| 
| 10.14 (74)
| 
| 12.12 (84)
| Arden Street Oval
| 30,000
| 4 May 1946
|- bgcolor="#FFFFFF"
| 
| 15.11 (101)
| 
| 19.17 (131)
| Glenferrie Oval
| 16,000
| 4 May 1946

Round 4

|- bgcolor="#CCCCFF"
| Home team
| Home team score
| Away team
| Away team score
| Venue
| Crowd
| Date
|- bgcolor="#FFFFFF"
| 
| 12.15 (87)
| 
| 11.8 (74)
| Punt Road Oval
| 18,000
| 11 May 1946
|- bgcolor="#FFFFFF"
| 
| 11.18 (84)
| 
| 19.12 (126)
| Kardinia Park
| 11,500
| 11 May 1946
|- bgcolor="#FFFFFF"
| 
| 19.19 (133)
| 
| 17.10 (112)
| Western Oval
| 27,000
| 11 May 1946
|- bgcolor="#FFFFFF"
| 
| 6.16 (52)
| 
| 16.18 (114)
| Princes Park
| 30,000
| 11 May 1946
|- bgcolor="#FFFFFF"
| 
| 8.6 (54)
| 
| 24.13 (157)
| Glenferrie Oval
| 10,000
| 11 May 1946
|- bgcolor="#FFFFFF"
| 
| 13.7 (85)
| 
| 14.20 (104)
| Junction Oval
| 15,000
| 11 May 1946

Round 5

|- bgcolor="#CCCCFF"
| Home team
| Home team score
| Away team
| Away team score
| Venue
| Crowd
| Date
|- bgcolor="#FFFFFF"
| 
| 11.8 (74)
| 
| 13.17 (95)
| Kardinia Park
| 9,000
| 18 May 1946
|- bgcolor="#FFFFFF"
| 
| 11.13 (79)
| 
| 4.15 (39)
| Windy Hill
| 17,000
| 18 May 1946
|- bgcolor="#FFFFFF"
| 
| 2.16 (28)
| 
| 14.10 (94)
| Victoria Park
| 24,000
| 18 May 1946
|- bgcolor="#FFFFFF"
| 
| 11.15 (81)
| 
| 9.11 (65)
| Princes Park
| 19,000
| 18 May 1946
|- bgcolor="#FFFFFF"
| 
| 11.21 (87)
| 
| 6.17 (53)
| Junction Oval
| 10,000
| 18 May 1946
|- bgcolor="#FFFFFF"
| 
| 12.13 (85)
| 
| 22.14 (146)
| Punt Road Oval
| 18,000
| 18 May 1946

Round 6

|- bgcolor="#CCCCFF"
| Home team
| Home team score
| Away team
| Away team score
| Venue
| Crowd
| Date
|- bgcolor="#FFFFFF"
| 
| 16.10 (106)
| 
| 13.13 (91)
| Glenferrie Oval
| 8,000
| 25 May 1946
|- bgcolor="#FFFFFF"
| 
| 7.21 (63)
| 
| 10.12 (72)
| Brunswick Street Oval
| 18,000
| 25 May 1946
|- bgcolor="#FFFFFF"
| 
| 21.23 (149)
| 
| 13.9 (87)
| Punt Road Oval
| 15,000
| 25 May 1946
|- bgcolor="#FFFFFF"
| 
| 5.13 (43)
| 
| 11.17 (83)
| Arden Street Oval
| 18,000
| 25 May 1946
|- bgcolor="#FFFFFF"
| 
| 10.12 (72)
| 
| 9.15 (69)
| Western Oval
| 29,000
| 25 May 1946
|- bgcolor="#FFFFFF"
| 
| 10.12 (72)
| 
| 22.17 (149)
| Junction Oval
| 19,000
| 25 May 1946

Round 7

|- bgcolor="#CCCCFF"
| Home team
| Home team score
| Away team
| Away team score
| Venue
| Crowd
| Date
|- bgcolor="#FFFFFF"
| 
| 20.20 (140)
| 
| 7.16 (58)
| Windy Hill
| 11,000
| 1 June 1946
|- bgcolor="#FFFFFF"
| 
| 15.13 (103)
| 
| 11.10 (76)
| Princes Park
| 42,000
| 1 June 1946
|- bgcolor="#FFFFFF"
| 
| 10.16 (76)
| 
| 10.10 (70)
| Junction Oval
| 17,000
| 1 June 1946
|- bgcolor="#FFFFFF"
| 
| 13.12 (90)
| 
| 14.15 (99)
| Glenferrie Oval
| 13,000
| 1 June 1946
|- bgcolor="#FFFFFF"
| 
| 5.11 (41)
| 
| 14.13 (97)
| Punt Road Oval
| 12,000
| 1 June 1946
|- bgcolor="#FFFFFF"
| 
| 10.8 (68)
| 
| 20.12 (132)
| Kardinia Park
| 10,000
| 1 June 1946

Round 8

|- bgcolor="#CCCCFF"
| Home team
| Home team score
| Away team
| Away team score
| Venue
| Crowd
| Date
|- bgcolor="#FFFFFF"
| 
| 14.14 (98)
| 
| 9.10 (64)
| Brunswick Street Oval
| 12,000
| 8 June 1946
|- bgcolor="#FFFFFF"
| 
| 9.2 (56)
| 
| 3.9 (27)
| Arden Street Oval
| 8,000
| 8 June 1946
|- bgcolor="#FFFFFF"
| 
| 10.10 (70)
| 
| 15.17 (107)
| Punt Road Oval
| 38,000
| 8 June 1946
|- bgcolor="#FFFFFF"
| 
| 7.5 (47)
| 
| 15.22 (112)
| Junction Oval
| 17,000
| 10 June 1946
|- bgcolor="#FFFFFF"
| 
| 16.22 (118)
| 
| 7.13 (55)
| Western Oval
| 15,000
| 10 June 1946
|- bgcolor="#FFFFFF"
| 
| 16.16 (112)
| 
| 7.14 (56)
| Victoria Park
| 40,000
| 10 June 1946

Round 9

|- bgcolor="#CCCCFF"
| Home team
| Home team score
| Away team
| Away team score
| Venue
| Crowd
| Date
|- bgcolor="#FFFFFF"
| 
| 14.12 (96)
| 
| 8.9 (57)
| Punt Road Oval
| 11,000
| 15 June 1946
|- bgcolor="#FFFFFF"
| 
| 16.10 (106)
| 
| 15.9 (99)
| Western Oval
| 22,000
| 15 June 1946
|- bgcolor="#FFFFFF"
| 
| 16.22 (118)
| 
| 11.10 (76)
| Windy Hill
| 32,000
| 15 June 1946
|- bgcolor="#FFFFFF"
| 
| 17.20 (122)
| 
| 14.13 (97)
| Glenferrie Oval
| 14,000
| 17 June 1946
|- bgcolor="#FFFFFF"
| 
| 18.20 (128)
| 
| 13.11 (89)
| Princes Park
| 17,000
| 17 June 1946
|- bgcolor="#FFFFFF"
| 
| 18.16 (124)
| 
| 15.20 (110)
| Junction Oval
| 38,000
| 17 June 1946

Round 10

|- bgcolor="#CCCCFF"
| Home team
| Home team score
| Away team
| Away team score
| Venue
| Crowd
| Date
|- bgcolor="#FFFFFF"
| 
| 18.17 (125)
| 
| 12.12 (84)
| Victoria Park
| 26,000
| 22 June 1946
|- bgcolor="#FFFFFF"
| 
| 12.20 (92)
| 
| 13.10 (88)
| Princes Park
| 39,000
| 22 June 1946
|- bgcolor="#FFFFFF"
| 
| 9.16 (70)
| 
| 13.8 (86)
| Punt Road Oval
| 18,000
| 22 June 1946
|- bgcolor="#FFFFFF"
| 
| 10.24 (84)
| 
| 9.12 (66)
| Junction Oval
| 8,000
| 22 June 1946
|- bgcolor="#FFFFFF"
| 
| 15.8 (98)
| 
| 13.10 (88)
| Arden Street Oval
| 12,000
| 22 June 1946
|- bgcolor="#FFFFFF"
| 
| 18.18 (126)
| 
| 12.15 (87)
| Kardinia Park
| 11,500
| 22 June 1946

Round 11

|- bgcolor="#CCCCFF"
| Home team
| Home team score
| Away team
| Away team score
| Venue
| Crowd
| Date
|- bgcolor="#FFFFFF"
| 
| 9.6 (60)
| 
| 14.14 (98)
| Glenferrie Oval
| 11,000
| 6 July 1946
|- bgcolor="#FFFFFF"
| 
| 18.9 (117)
| 
| 9.12 (66)
| Western Oval
| 18,000
| 6 July 1946
|- bgcolor="#FFFFFF"
| 
| 12.14 (86)
| 
| 7.11 (53)
| Brunswick Street Oval
| 7,000
| 6 July 1946
|- bgcolor="#FFFFFF"
| 
| 12.19 (91)
| 
| 7.12 (54)
| Junction Oval
| 9,000
| 6 July 1946
|- bgcolor="#FFFFFF"
| 
| 13.13 (91)
| 
| 10.9 (69)
| Punt Road Oval
| 17,000
| 6 July 1946
|- bgcolor="#FFFFFF"
| 
| 12.12 (84)
| 
| 9.9 (63)
| Windy Hill
| 29,000
| 6 July 1946

Round 12

|- bgcolor="#CCCCFF"
| Home team
| Home team score
| Away team
| Away team score
| Venue
| Crowd
| Date
|- bgcolor="#FFFFFF"
| 
| 15.7 (97)
| 
| 21.14 (140)
| Kardinia Park
| 11,500
| 13 July 1946
|- bgcolor="#FFFFFF"
| 
| 16.24 (120)
| 
| 14.8 (92)
| Windy Hill
| 29,000
| 13 July 1946
|- bgcolor="#FFFFFF"
| 
| 15.23 (113)
| 
| 11.14 (80)
| Victoria Park
| 11,000
| 13 July 1946
|- bgcolor="#FFFFFF"
| 
| 12.13 (85)
| 
| 11.18 (84)
| Princes Park
| 26,000
| 13 July 1946
|- bgcolor="#FFFFFF"
| 
| 10.14 (74)
| 
| 12.11 (83)
| Junction Oval
| 7,000
| 13 July 1946
|- bgcolor="#FFFFFF"
| 
| 14.14 (98)
| 
| 10.12 (72)
| Punt Road Oval
| 19,000
| 13 July 1946

Round 13

|- bgcolor="#CCCCFF"
| Home team
| Home team score
| Away team
| Away team score
| Venue
| Crowd
| Date
|- bgcolor="#FFFFFF"
| 
| 6.11 (47)
| 
| 11.9 (75)
| Arden Street Oval
| 10,000
| 20 July 1946
|- bgcolor="#FFFFFF"
| 
| 5.11 (41)
| 
| 6.10 (46)
| Western Oval
| 10,000
| 20 July 1946
|- bgcolor="#FFFFFF"
| 
| 15.22 (112)
| 
| 11.15 (81)
| Glenferrie Oval
| 5,000
| 20 July 1946
|- bgcolor="#FFFFFF"
| 
| 9.13 (67)
| 
| 10.8 (68)
| Junction Oval
| 23,000
| 20 July 1946
|- bgcolor="#FFFFFF"
| 
| 8.8 (56)
| 
| 8.13 (61)
| Brunswick Street Oval
| 15,000
| 20 July 1946
|- bgcolor="#FFFFFF"
| 
| 10.12 (72)
| 
| 7.13 (55)
| Punt Road Oval
| 26,000
| 20 July 1946

Round 14

|- bgcolor="#CCCCFF"
| Home team
| Home team score
| Away team
| Away team score
| Venue
| Crowd
| Date
|- bgcolor="#FFFFFF"
| 
| 12.12 (84)
| 
| 4.7 (31)
| Western Oval
| 21,000
| 27 July 1946
|- bgcolor="#FFFFFF"
| 
| 17.19 (121)
| 
| 9.16 (70)
| Victoria Park
| 14,000
| 27 July 1946
|- bgcolor="#FFFFFF"
| 
| 15.18 (108)
| 
| 10.11 (71)
| Princes Park
| 17,000
| 27 July 1946
|- bgcolor="#FFFFFF"
| 
| 9.9 (63)
| 
| 16.16 (112)
| Junction Oval
| 12,000
| 27 July 1946
|- bgcolor="#FFFFFF"
| 
| 9.9 (63)
| 
| 8.7 (55)
| Kardinia Park
| 10,000
| 27 July 1946
|- bgcolor="#FFFFFF"
| 
| 9.24 (78)
| 
| 10.13 (73)
| Punt Road Oval
| 30,000
| 27 July 1946

Round 15

|- bgcolor="#CCCCFF"
| Home team
| Home team score
| Away team
| Away team score
| Venue
| Crowd
| Date
|- bgcolor="#FFFFFF"
| 
| 21.18 (144)
| 
| 12.7 (79)
| Windy Hill
| 12,000
| 3 August 1946
|- bgcolor="#FFFFFF"
| 
| 15.24 (114)
| 
| 10.9 (69)
| Victoria Park
| 12,000
| 3 August 1946
|- bgcolor="#FFFFFF"
| 
| 15.16 (106)
| 
| 14.11 (95)
| Junction Oval
| 22,000
| 3 August 1946
|- bgcolor="#FFFFFF"
| 
| 15.10 (100)
| 
| 6.12 (48)
| Arden Street Oval
| 7,500
| 3 August 1946
|- bgcolor="#FFFFFF"
| 
| 12.21 (93)
| 
| 14.15 (99)
| Punt Road Oval
| 31,000
| 3 August 1946
|- bgcolor="#FFFFFF"
| 
| 14.10 (94)
| 
| 11.8 (74)
| Brunswick Street Oval
| 21,000
| 3 August 1946

Round 16

|- bgcolor="#CCCCFF"
| Home team
| Home team score
| Away team
| Away team score
| Venue
| Crowd
| Date
|- bgcolor="#FFFFFF"
| 
| 12.15 (87)
| 
| 16.14 (110)
| Glenferrie Oval
| 13,000
| 10 August 1946
|- bgcolor="#FFFFFF"
| 
| 13.13 (91)
| 
| 16.16 (112)
| Western Oval
| 23,000
| 10 August 1946
|- bgcolor="#FFFFFF"
| 
| 20.10 (130)
| 
| 8.11 (59)
| Junction Oval
| 6,000
| 10 August 1946
|- bgcolor="#FFFFFF"
| 
| 14.18 (102)
| 
| 7.16 (58)
| Brunswick Street Oval
| 16,000
| 10 August 1946
|- bgcolor="#FFFFFF"
| 
| 18.9 (117)
| 
| 12.15 (87)
| Punt Road Oval
| 32,000
| 10 August 1946
|- bgcolor="#FFFFFF"
| 
| 13.9 (87)
| 
| 10.18 (78)
| Arden Street Oval
| 16,000
| 10 August 1946

Round 17

|- bgcolor="#CCCCFF"
| Home team
| Home team score
| Away team
| Away team score
| Venue
| Crowd
| Date
|- bgcolor="#FFFFFF"
| 
| 13.11 (89)
| 
| 16.11 (107)
| Kardinia Park
| 11,000
| 17 August 1946
|- bgcolor="#FFFFFF"
| 
| 18.14 (122)
| 
| 4.10 (34)
| Windy Hill
| 16,000
| 17 August 1946
|- bgcolor="#FFFFFF"
| 
| 20.12 (132)
| 
| 10.10 (70)
| Victoria Park
| 25,000
| 17 August 1946
|- bgcolor="#FFFFFF"
| 
| 14.8 (92)
| 
| 10.17 (77)
| Princes Park
| 13,000
| 17 August 1946
|- bgcolor="#FFFFFF"
| 
| 18.15 (123)
| 
| 13.8 (86)
| MCG
| 16,000
| 17 August 1946
|- bgcolor="#FFFFFF"
| 
| 7.16 (58)
| 
| 12.15 (87)
| Junction Oval
| 18,000
| 17 August 1946

Round 18

|- bgcolor="#CCCCFF"
| Home team
| Home team score
| Away team
| Away team score
| Venue
| Crowd
| Date
|- bgcolor="#FFFFFF"
| 
| 11.8 (74)
| 
| 15.19 (109)
| Arden Street Oval
| 7,000
| 24 August 1946
|- bgcolor="#FFFFFF"
| 
| 23.27 (165)
| 
| 8.5 (53)
| Western Oval
| 12,000
| 24 August 1946
|- bgcolor="#FFFFFF"
| 
| 9.11 (65)
| 
| 10.9 (69)
| Brunswick Street Oval
| 19,000
| 24 August 1946
|- bgcolor="#FFFFFF"
| 
| 17.26 (128)
| 
| 7.11 (53)
| Victoria Park
| 11,000
| 24 August 1946
|- bgcolor="#FFFFFF"
| 
| 11.9 (75)
| 
| 16.20 (116)
| Junction Oval
| 9,000
| 24 August 1946
|- bgcolor="#FFFFFF"
| 
| 16.29 (125)
| 
| 13.15 (93)
| Punt Road Oval
| 38,000
| 24 August 1946

Round 19

|- bgcolor="#CCCCFF"
| Home team
| Home team score
| Away team
| Away team score
| Venue
| Crowd
| Date
|- bgcolor="#FFFFFF"
| 
| 17.11 (113)
| 
| 11.10 (76)
| MCG
| 19,000
| 31 August 1946
|- bgcolor="#FFFFFF"
| 
| 16.18 (114)
| 
| 18.5 (113)
| Windy Hill
| 23,000
| 31 August 1946
|- bgcolor="#FFFFFF"
| 
| 15.11 (101)
| 
| 14.12 (96)
| Princes Park
| 27,000
| 31 August 1946
|- bgcolor="#FFFFFF"
| 
| 14.10 (94)
| 
| 6.13 (49)
| Junction Oval
| 10,000
| 31 August 1946
|- bgcolor="#FFFFFF"
| 
| 17.18 (120)
| 
| 12.5 (77)
| Kardinia Park
| 12,000
| 31 August 1946
|- bgcolor="#FFFFFF"
| 
| 9.15 (69)
| 
| 12.22 (94)
| Glenferrie Oval
| 6,000
| 31 August 1946

Ladder

Finals

Semi finals

|- bgcolor="#CCCCFF"
| Home team
| Score
| Away team
| Score
| Venue
| Crowd
| Date
|- bgcolor="#FFFFFF"
| 
| 15.12 (102)
| 
| 17.18 (120)
| MCG
| 61,277
| 7 September
|- bgcolor="#FFFFFF"
| 
| 14.16 (100)
| 
| 13.22 (100)
| MCG
| 77,370
| 14 September
|- bgcolor="#FFFFFF"
| 
| 10.16 (76)
| 
| 8.9 (57)
| MCG
| 64,903
| 21 September

Preliminary Final

|- bgcolor="#CCCCFF"
| Home team
| Score
| Away team
| Score
| Venue
| Crowd
| Date
|- bgcolor="#FFFFFF"
| 
| 14.16 (100)
| 
| 16.17 (113)
| MCG
| 59,444
| 28 September

Grand final

Essendon defeated Melbourne 22.18 (150) to 13.9 (87), in front of a crowd of 72,743 people. (For an explanation of scoring see Australian rules football).

Awards
 The 1946 VFL Premiership team was Essendon.
 The VFL's leading goalkicker was Bill Brittingham of Essendon with 66 goals, including 8 goals in the finals series. Des Fothergill of Collingwood was the leading goal-kicker in the home-and-home season, with 63 goals.
 The winner of the 1946 Brownlow Medal was Don Cordner of Melbourne with 20 votes. Cordner was the first of the only two amateur players ever to win the Brownlow Medal; the second was Footscray's John Schultz in 1960.
 Hawthorn took the "wooden spoon" in 1946.
Richmond 7.15 (57) defeated  7.14 (56) in the Grand Final, played as a curtain-raiser to the senior preliminary final on Saturday 28 September at the Melbourne Cricket Ground.
North Melbourne 11.9 (75) defeated  5.12 (42) in the Grand Final, played on Saturday 21 September.

Notable events
 The ANFC introduced a second substitute player, known as the 20th man; this meant that a team was now composed of 18 "run on" players, and two "reserves" on the bench. A player could be substituted for any reason (not just if he was injured and unable to continue). Once substituted, a player could not return to the field of play under any circumstances. As with the 19th man, the 20th man was paid a match fee only in the event that he took the field.
 The ANFC rejected a joint proposal from New South Wales and Tasmania to introduce an "order off" rule for foul play.
 The VFL introduced a new Under-19 competition; the teams are referred to as the Third Eighteens.
 The VFL resumes the Brownlow Medal award.
 In Round 1, 33-year-old former champion full-forward Bob Pratt returned to South Melbourne after playing for VFA club Coburg (1940–1941) and serving in the Royal Australian Air Force (1942–1945). He kicked two goals before badly injuring a leg, and never played again.
 In Round 2, North Melbourne won its first ever VFL away match against Richmond, having lost the previous 15 meetings.
 From ninth position on the ladder at the end of Round 8, Melbourne won 13 of its next 14 matches and play in the Grand Final.
 At half time in the closely contested Grand Final, a straighter-kicking Melbourne 10.4 (64) was three points in front of Essendon 9.7 (61); in the third quarter Essendon kicked 11.8 (74) to Melbourne's 1.1 (7).

Notes

References
 Maplestone, M., Flying Higher: History of the Essendon Football Club 1872–1996, Essendon Football Club, (Melbourne), 1996. 
 Rogers, S. & Brown, A., Every Game Ever Played: VFL/AFL Results 1897–1997 (Sixth Edition), Viking Books, (Ringwood), 1998. 
 Ross, J. (ed), 100 Years of Australian Football 1897–1996: The Complete Story of the AFL, All the Big Stories, All the Great Pictures, All the Champions, Every AFL Season Reported, Viking, (Ringwood), 1996.

External links
 1946 Season – AFL Tables

Australian Football League seasons
Season